The Iola Independent School District is a public school district based in Iola, Texas, United States. The district serves Iola and unincorporated areas in northwestern Grimes County.

Schools
The Iola Independent School District operates two schools – Iola Elementary School (grades PK-6) and Iola High School  (grades 7-12). Both schools as well as the district's administrative offices are housed on a single campus at the corner of FM 39 and Fort Worth Street.

In September 2009, Iola Elementary School was declared a National Blue Ribbon School of Excellence by the United States Department of Education.

Student demographics
As of the 2008-2009 school year, Iola ISD enrolled a total of 497 students. The gender distribution was 230 males (46.3%) and 267 females (53.7%). The ethnic composition of the district was 85.71% White, 10.87% Hispanic, and 3.42% African American. 45.1% of the district's students were considered economically disadvantaged with 26.0% classified as "At-Risk."

Historic district enrollment

1988-89 - 364 students
1989-90 - 378 students
1990-91 - 373 students
1991-92 - 388 students
1992-93 - 406 students

1993-94 - 422 students
1994-95 - 433 students
1995-96 - 450 students
1996-97 - 491 students
1997-98 - 452 students

1998-99 - 441 students
1999-00 - 473 students
2000-01 - 447 students
2001-02 - 453 students
2002-03 - 451 students

2003-04 - 472 students
2004-05 - 497 students
2005-06 - 508 students
2006-07 - 488 students
2007-08 - 506 students

In 1965 the school had 235 students in all 12 grades in one building. Of the students, 85 were high school students.

See also

List of school districts in Texas

References

External links
Iola Independent School District – Official site.

School districts in Grimes County, Texas